Jack Chester Stroud  (January 29, 1928 – June 1, 1994) was an American football offensive lineman in the National Football League for the New York Giants. He played college football  at the University of Tennessee and was drafted in the fifth round of the 1951 NFL Draft.

While at Tennessee, Stroud was also a member of the track and field team and twice placed first in the javelin throw (1950, 1951) at the Southeastern Conference meet.

References

1928 births
1994 deaths
American football offensive linemen
Tennessee Volunteers football players
New York Giants players
Eastern Conference Pro Bowl players